Jalen Ahmad Reeves-Maybin (born January 31, 1995) is an American football linebacker who is a free agent. He played college football at Tennessee. He was drafted in the 4th round of the 2017 NFL Draft by the Detroit Lions.

Early years
Reeves-Maybin is the son of LaDawn Reeves and Marques Maybin. He attended Northeast High School in Clarksville, Tennessee. He played high school football for Northeast. He contributed to the team on offense as a quarterback. He gained more than 2,000 rushing yards as a senior, including 1,000 yards in three postseason games, with more than 300 yards in each game. He scored two touchdowns in playoff game against eventual state champion Beech Senior High School. He was named as an All-State selection on defense in 2012 by the Tennessee Sports Writers.

College career

Before the 2013 season, Reeves-Maybin committed to play college football for the University of Tennessee under head coach Butch Jones.

2013 season
During the 2013 season, Reeves-Maybin, as a true freshman, was a standout on special teams with a team-best 11 tackles. He rotated between linebacker and defensive back, playing in 11 games with 14 tackles on the season. He had at least one tackle on special teams in six games in a row. In the annual rivalry game against the #6 Georgia Bulldogs, he had three tackles and blocked a punt in the third quarter that resulted in a touchdown punt return by teammate Devaun Swafford in the 34–31 overtime loss.

2014 season
During the 2014 season, Reeves-Maybin started in all 13 games. He finished tied for first on the team with 101 tackles with 11.0 tackles-for-loss. In his first career start, he recorded 10 tackles in the 38–7 victory over Utah State in the 2014 season opener at Neyland Stadium. He made his first-career interception, coming against rival Florida in the third quarter of the 10–9 loss. He posted a career-high 13 tackles in the 2015 TaxSlayer Bowl 45–28 victory over Iowa.

2015 season
During the 2015 season, Reeves-Maybin started in all 13 games. He finished seventh in overall tackles with 105 and ninth in the SEC in tackles per game (8.1). He led the team with 14.0 tackles-for-loss, which ranked eighth in the SEC, and second on team in sacks with 5.0. He had six tackles including a 9-yard sack in the 2016 Outback Bowl 45–6 victory over Northwestern. He had a team-high nine tackles including a tackle-for-loss along with the game-sealing fumble recovery in the final minute and an additional forced fumble in the 27–24 victory over rival South Carolina. He had a team-best 11 tackles, including 2.5 tackles-for-loss and a sack in the 19–14 loss at #8 Alabama in the annual rivalry game. He had a career-high 21 tackles, most by a Volunteer since A. J. Johnson in 2012, including 3.0 tackles-for loss in a 2OT loss to #19 Oklahoma. He finished seventh in overall tackles with 105 and ninth in the SEC in tackles per game. He led the team with 14.0 tackles-for-loss, which ranked him eighth in the SEC, and was second on the team in sacks with 6.0.

2016 season
During the 2016 season, Reeves-Maybin suffered through an injury-plagued senior season. He started only four games, all in the early portion of the schedule. In the season opener against Appalachian State, he was ejected for targeting on a special teams play early in the game. He made 13 tackles and 1.5 tackles-for-loss in the 45–24 victory over Virginia Tech in the 2016 Pilot Flying J Battle at Bristol. In the third game of the season against Ohio, he suffered a left shoulder injury and had to leave the game. The next week, he appeared in the annual rivalry game against #19 Florida before exiting the game due to the injury. On October 18, it was announced that he would be sidelined for the rest of the season. 

After the 2016 regular season, Reeves-Maybin declared his intention to enter the 2017 NFL Draft.

Collegiate statistics

Professional career
Reeves-Maybin was one of 29 collegiate linebackers to attend the NFL Scouting Combine in Indianapolis, Indiana. He chose to only have measurements taken and met with teams due to a pre-existing shoulder injury. On March 31, 2017, Reeves-Maybin attended Tennessee's pro day and performed all of the positional and combine drills for scouts and team representatives from all 32 NFL teams, including five NFL defensive coordinators and Pittsburgh Steelers' head coach Mike Tomlin. At the conclusion of the pre-draft process, Reeves-Maybin was projected to be a sixth or seventh round pick by NFL draft experts and scouts. He was ranked the 23rd best outside linebacker prospect in the draft by NFLDraftScout.com.

Detroit Lions
The Detroit Lions selected Reeves-Maybin in the fourth round (124th overall) of the 2017 NFL Draft. He was the 11th linebacker chosen in 2017 and the second linebacker drafted by the Lions, behind first-rounder Jarrad Davis.

2017 season
On May 12, 2017, the Detroit Lions signed Reeves-Maybin to a four-year, $3.01 million contract with a signing bonus of $618,887.

Throughout training camp, he competed against Thurston Armbrister, Steve Longa, and Antwione Williams for a role as the backup outside linebacker. Head coach Jim Caldwell named Reeves-Maybin the backup weakside linebacker behind Tahir Whitehead to start the regular season.

He made his professional regular season debut in the Detroit Lions' season-opening 35–23 victory over the Arizona Cardinals. On September 18, 2017, he recorded two combined tackles in a 24–10 victory at the New York Giants. In Week 8, Reeves-Maybin collected five combined tackles while playing only 22 defensive snaps in the Lions' 20–15 loss to the Pittsburgh Steelers. Reeves-Maybin missed two games (Weeks 10–11) with an ankle injury. On December 10, 2017, he made a season-high six combined tackles, deflected a pass, and made assisted on his first career sack in the Lions' 24–21 victory at the Tampa Bay Buccaneers. He made his first career sack with teammate D. J. Hayden, as they both tackled quarterback Jameis Winston for a nine-yard loss. He finished his rookie season with 30 combined tackles (25 solo), two pass deflections, and was credited with a half a sack in 14 games and zero starts. Head coach Jim Caldwell was fired after the season although the Detroit Lions finished second in the NFC North with a 9–7 record.

2018 season
In 2018, Reeves-Maybin played in nine games before being placed on injured reserve on December 5, with toe and neck injuries.

2019 season
In the 2019 season, Reeves-Maybin appeared in all 16 games and recorded 37 total tackles and one forced fumble.

2020 season
In the 2020 season, Reeves-Maybin appeared in all 16 games and recorded ten total tackles.

2021 season
On March 17, 2021, Reeves-Maybin re-signed with the Lions. In the 2021 season, he finished with 82 total tackles, four passes defensed, and two forced fumbles in 15 games.

Houston Texans
On March 23, 2022, Reeves-Maybin signed a two-year contract with the Houston Texans. He was released on March 16, 2023.

Personal life
Reeves-Maybin is the cousin of former Detroit Tigers outfielder Cameron Maybin.

Additionally, he is the son of former Louisville Cardinals standout basketball player Marques Maybin. Marques was a shooting guard at the University of Louisville from 1997–2001.

References

External links

Houston Texans bio
Tennessee Volunteers bio

1995 births
American football linebackers
Detroit Lions players
Living people
People from Clarksville, Tennessee
Players of American football from Tennessee
Tennessee Volunteers football players
Houston Texans players